Columbia Airport  is a privately owned, public use airport in Lorain County, Ohio, United States. It is located one nautical mile (2 km) northwest of the central business district of Columbia Station, Ohio.

Facilities and aircraft 
Columbia Airport covers an area of 87 acres (35 ha) at an elevation of 813 feet (248 m) above mean sea level. It has one asphalt paved runway designated 18R/36L which measures 3,152 by 40 feet (961 x 12 m) and two turf runways: 18L/36R is 2,947 by 65 feet (898 x 20 m) and 2/20 is 2,580 by 85 feet (786 x 26 m).

For the 12-month period ending June 17, 2010, the airport had 5,150 general aviation aircraft operations, an average of 14 per day. At that time there were 44 aircraft based at this airport: 95.5% single-engine and 4.5% multi-engine.

See also 
 List of airports in Ohio

References

External links 
 Aerial image as of October 2000 from USGS The National Map

Airports in Ohio
Buildings and structures in Lorain County, Ohio
Transportation in Lorain County, Ohio